Sara Errani and Roberta Vinci were the defending champions, but chose not to participate.
Sania Mirza and Anastasia Rodionova won the title after defeating Chan Hao-ching and Chan Yung-jan 3–6, 6–1, [10–8] in the final.

Seeds

Draw

Draw

References
 Main Draw

Doubles
PTT Pattaya Open - Doubles
 in women's tennis